Păltiniș is a mountain resort and village administered by Sibiu municipality, Sibiu County, Romania.

Păltiniș may refer to several other places in Romania:

 Păltiniș, Botoșani, a commune in Botoșani County
 Păltiniș, Caraș-Severin, a commune in Caraș-Severin County
 Păltiniș, a village in Asău Commune, Bacău County
 Păltiniș, a village in Gura Teghii Commune, Buzău County
 Păltiniș, a village in Lupeni Commune, Harghita County
 Păltiniș, a village in Panaci Commune, Suceava County
 Păltiniș, a village in Băcești Commune, Vaslui County
 Păltiniș, a tributary of the Arieșul Mic in Alba County
 Păltiniș (Bâsca), a tributary of the Bâsca in Buzău County
 Păltiniș, a tributary of the Cernu in Bacău County
 Păltiniș, a tributary of the Cibin in Sibiu County

See also 
 Paltin (disambiguation)
 Păltinișu (disambiguation)